Department of Chemicals and Petro-Chemicals is an agency of the Indian government established in 1991. The agency is part of the Ministry of Chemicals and Fertilisers. The responsibilities of the departments include policy, planning, development and regulation of Chemicals and Petrochemicals Industries

References

1991 establishments in Delhi
Government agencies established in 1991
Ministry of Chemicals and Fertilizers